Richard Frank Vogler (July 26, 1950 – July 21, 1990) was an American champion sprint car and midget car driver. He was nicknamed "Rapid Rich". He competed in the Indianapolis 500 five times, and his best finish was eighth in 1989.

Racing career
Vogler was the National Alliance of Midget Auto Racing (NAMAR) midget champion in 1973. He won the midget car track championships at the Indianapolis Speedrome in 1984 and 1985. He won the Fireman Nationals midget car race at Angell Park Speedway in 1985. Vogler became the first driver to win the USAC Sprint Car and Midget championships in the same year (1980). He won USAC National Sprint Car Series championships in 1980 and 1989, USAC National Midget Series championships in 1978, 1980, 1983, 1986, and 1988.

He won numerous major national events: the Hut Hundred eight times, the 4-Crown Nationals midget car event four times, the Copper Classic twice, the Hoosierdome Invitational twice, the WWRA Florida Winter Nationals in 1983, and the Night Before the 500 once. In 1987 he won the inaugural Chili Bowl Midget Nationals race.

Vogler finished seventeenth in his only NASCAR Busch Series start at the North Carolina Speedway in Rockingham in 1988.

Career summary

His 134 wins (95 Midget, 35 Sprint, and four Silver Crown wins) in national events is second only to A. J. Foyt's 169. Vogler had 170 total USAC wins, and won over 200 "outlaw" (non-USAC) midget races.

Indianapolis 500 Participation
Vogler made his first start in Indianapolis 500 participation in 1985 where he drove the #60 Patrick Racing/KFC car to a 23rd-place finish. He would make consecutive starts at Indy from then on, up until 1990. During most of his IndyCar tenure he was sponsored by KFC, whom he had a longtime professional relationship with. 

In 1988, Vogler was running 20+ laps down in the race when he waived his position to former Formula 1 champion Emerson Fittipaldi. USAC, however, did not see Vogler waive Fittipaldi by, and, as a result, they penalized Fittipaldi two laps. When Vogler got word of Fittipaldi's penalty, he went up to USAC to testify for him, calling the penalty "unjust." The following morning, in part because of Vogler's testimony, the penalty was overturned and Fittipaldi was credited with the runner-up position.

Death
Days before his 40th birthday, Vogler was competing in a nationally broadcast ESPN Thunder Joe James / Pat O'Connor Memorial sprint car event at Salem Speedway. He was leading the race at the time, when his car crashed with just over a lap to go. Vogler's helmet flew off his head and he suffered severe head injuries that proved to be fatal.

Because of USAC rules on a red flag reverting to the previous completed lap, he was declared the winner of the event following his death, which was his 170th win. He was scheduled to make his NASCAR Winston Cup (now NASCAR Cup Series) series debut at Pocono Raceway the day after his fatal crash. He was awarded a 40th-place finish (as a "Did Not Start").

The Pocono race was not his first attempted NASCAR Winston Cup start: two weeks before, he entered the Michigan race but failed to qualify. At the time, Vogler was scheduled to run the full Winston Cup Series in the near-future for  U.S. Racing but was replaced posthumously by Ted Musgrave.

Memorials
His mother Eleanor started a college scholarship fund for aspiring Indiana students as part of Rich's concern over his sons, and the fund was started by USAC officials and sponsor Valvoline.

The first major fund-raiser for the fund has been a Daytona 500 viewing party in Indianapolis, today well-attended with a silent auction and notable names in auto racing in the state as guests. Usually, his mother and his sons appear at the annual fund-raiser. In 2008, the viewing party was moved to the Indianapolis Motor Speedway, where 1996 scholarship recipient Ryan Newman won the aforementioned race.

In April 1991, Winchester Speedway began the annual season-opening Rich Vogler Classic sprint car race, usually the first race at the track each year.

There is also a Team Vogler Classic at the Indianapolis Speedrome. His father Donald Vogler died in a midget car accident at the Indianapolis Speedrome on May 1, 1981.

Career awards
He was inducted in the National Sprint Car Hall of Fame in 1992.
He was inducted in the National Midget Auto Racing Hall of Fame in 1986.
He was inducted in the Motorsports Hall of Fame of America in 2010.

Motorsports career results

Complete USAC Mini-Indy (Formula Super Vee) Results

Complete USAC Championship Car results

Complete PPG Indy Car Series results

NASCAR
(key) (Bold – Pole position awarded by qualifying time. Italics – Pole position earned by points standings or practice time. * – Most laps led.)

Winston Cup Series

Busch Series

References

External links

Rich Vogler Memorial Scholarship Fund webpage

1950 births
1990 deaths
Champ Car drivers
SCCA Formula Super Vee drivers
American Speed Association drivers
Indianapolis 500 drivers
National Sprint Car Hall of Fame inductees
Racing drivers from Chicago
Racing drivers who died while racing
NASCAR drivers
Sports deaths in Indiana
People from Washington County, Indiana
Filmed deaths in motorsport
USAC Silver Crown Series drivers
EuroInternational drivers
A. J. Foyt Enterprises drivers